Mzoura may refer to,
Msoura
Mzoura, Settat Province